Mutthi Bhar Mitti is a Pakistani Telefilm that premiered on Hum TV on 14 August 2008. The telefilm is directed by Haissam Hussain and written by novelist and screenplay writer Umera Ahmad.

As a framing device, the main character, Jamaal played by Qavi Khan with narration by Umera Ahmad, in the year 2008 recounts to himself the events that led to him leaving India and migrating to Pakistan after The Great Indian Partition, which explains the title and allows for a narration in the past tense. Other main characters include Mubarak Ali (Khayyam Sarhadi), Muzaffar (Faisal Qureshi) and Salima (Samina Peerzada).

Synopsis

Mubarak Ali is a hardcore supporter of Congress League. He loathes the politics of Muslim League and says their dream of a separate homeland for Muslims of India is a mere farce. However his son Muzaffar is a young patriotic lad who strongly supports Muslim League's idea and admires his leader, Muhammad Ali Jinnah. Muzaffar goes to study at Aligarh University which is the hub for all Muslims working for the idea of Pakistan. Whilst he's there his passion only increases and when he comes back home he goes door to door to campaign for the upcoming election. As a result, The Muslim League will have sweeping victory in Muslims-majority regions and Muslims will have to leave India. Muzaffar and his entire family would be slaughtered, except his father and young brother Jamaal, who will live and migrate to Pakistan.

Cast
 Mohammed Qavi Khan as Jamaal
 Khayyam Sarhadi
 Faisal Qureshi
 Samina Peerzada
 Farhan Ali Agha
 Qaiser Naqvi
 Zhalay Sarhadi
 Zeba Ali
 Jahanara Hai
 Tipu Sharif
 Hashim Butt
 Sohail Omer
 Fahad Mirza
 Natasha

Supporting characters
There are many supporting actors in the telefilm who play short but important roles, which serve as a backdrop of a defeatist people all of whom want to run away from the country. It includes Salman Saquib (Mani) and Azfar Ali as Bobby and Imran, their screen-names from sitcom Sub Set Hai.

Mustafa Qureshi, plays a passer-by who is talking about leaving the country. Jahan Ara Hayee and Aijazz Aslam also play similar characters.

References

Hum TV original programming
Pakistani television films
Urdu-language television shows
Television shows set in Karachi